Maria Barbal i Farré (Tremp, Pallars Jussà, 17 September 1949) is a Spanish writer.

Career
Even though she has lived in Barcelona from the 1960s onward, the literary world of her early work as an author concentrates on the Pallars county of her childhood and adolescence, a rural surrounding observed by a critical eye. Her first novel, Pedra de tartera [‘Stone from a boulder’], fully set in that space, was praised by the public and critics alike. Her first novel has been translated into English as Stone in a Landslide.
Later works take up more urban environments. She also is the author of short stories, juvenile novels, and a theatre play.

Barbal’s work has been translated into Asturian, French, German, Portuguese, Spanish, and Dutch. Her literary achievements got her the Creu de Sant Jordi, i.e. Cross of Saint George, the highest medal awarded by the Catalan government.

Literary work

Novels
1985 Pedra de tartera
1990 Mel i metzines
1992 Càmfora
1996 Escrivia cartes al cel
1999 Carrer Bolívia
2002 Cicle de Pallars
2003 Bella edat
2005 País íntim

Prose
2001 Camins de quietud: Un recorergut literari per pobles abandonats del Pirineu

Short narrative
1986 La mort de Teresa
1994 Ulleres de sol
1998 Bari

Child and juvenile narrative
1991 Pampallugues
1992 Des de la gàbia
1995 Espaguetti Miu

Theatre
2000 L'helicòpter

References

External links

Author’s website at the Associació d'Escriptors en Llengua Catalana (Catalan Writers’ Association), in Catalan.
The author at the Qui és qui de les lletres catalanes (Who is who in Catalan literature), in Catalan.

Writers from Catalonia
Catalan-language writers
1949 births
Living people
Spanish women novelists
Spanish women short story writers
Spanish women children's writers
Women dramatists and playwrights
Short story writers from Catalonia
Spanish children's writers
20th-century Spanish women writers
21st-century Spanish women writers
20th-century Spanish novelists
21st-century novelists
20th-century Spanish writers
21st-century Spanish writers
20th-century Spanish dramatists and playwrights
People from Pallars Jussà
20th-century short story writers
21st-century short story writers
Premi d'Honor de les Lletres Catalanes winners